Leon Benko (born 11 November 1983) is a Croatian professional footballer who plays as a forward for NK Varteks.

A product of NK Varteks youth academy, Benko had spells abroad in the German Bundesliga with 1. FC Nürnberg and in Belgium with Standard Liège and K.V. Kortrijk. He was the 2012–13 Prva HNL league's top goalscorer.

Club career

Varteks
Benko signed his first professional contract with his youth club, NK Varteks, in July 2003, and continued to play for the club in the following three seasons under coaches Miroslav Blažević (2003–05) and Zlatko Dalić (2005–06). In his second season at Varteks he established himself as one of the club's key players, appearing in 26 matches in the Croatian First League.

In the summer of 2005, he also performed well for Varteks in the UEFA Intertoto Cup, scoring all four goals in their 4–1 victory over Dinamo Tirana as well as a brace that included the winning goal in a 4–3 victory over Inter Turku. He finished the 2005–06 season as the club's top scorer, scoring 14 goals in 27 league appearances, and was instrumental in the club's 2005–06 Croatian Cup campaign in which they reached the final before losing to Rijeka on away goals rule. His excellent performances at Varteks earned him the 2005 Hope of the Year award for Croatia's best young player.

Nürnberg
On 23 May 2006, it was announced that Benko has signed for German Bundesliga side 1. FC Nürnberg on a three-year contract with an optional one-year extension. He made his Bundesliga debut on 12 August 2006, playing as a substitute in the last five minutes of the club's first league match of the 2006–07 season, a 3–0 away victory at VfB Stuttgart. He finished his first Bundesliga season with only seven appearances, having missed the entire second part of the season due to injury problems.

He scored his first goal for Nürnberg on 29 November 2007 in their UEFA Cup group match against eventual winners of the competition, Zenit Saint Petersburg, securing his team a 2–2 away draw. He made a total of four appearances for Nürnberg in the 2007–08 season of the UEFA Cup.

Standard Liège
On 4 August 2008, Benko moved to Belgian side Standard Liège for an undisclosed fee, signing a one-year contract with an optional extension. He made his debut for the club on 16 August 2008 in their 3–1 away win at FCV Dender in the first round of the 2008–09 Jupiler League, coming on as a late substitute. In his only season with the club he made only 14 league appearances due to his injury problems. He managed to win the Belgian First Division title with the club.

K.V. Kortrijk
On 30 June 2009, K.V. Kortrijk signed the Croatian forward from Standard Liège until June 2010.

Slaven Belupo
On 29 January 2011, Benko signed a one-and-a-half-year contract with Slaven Belupo. In his first game for Slaven, he scored a goal in a 2–1 loss against RNK Split.
By the end of the season he made ten more appearances for the club and scored eight goals in the process. 
He opened the new season by scoring a goal against NK Zagreb on matchday 1 in July 2011. He scored seven goals in Croatian First League and added three assists by the end of the mid-season when he was transferred to Saudi Professional League club Al-Faisaly.

Rijeka
In June 2012, it was announced that Benko will be joining HNK Rijeka. He was given the number 19 shirt.

Benko made his debut for the new club against NK Zadar at the end of the July, and scored his first goal on Matchday 4 of the season against Lokomotiva Zagreb. In his first season with the club he fulfilled the expectations of the club officials and the fans as he was the 2012–13 Prva HNL league's top scorer with 18 goals in 30 appearances. At the end of the season, he was awarded with SN Yellow Shirt award, as the best football player in the 2012–13 Prva HNL, based on post-match ratings awarded by sports journalists over the course of a season. The club finished third in the 2012–13 Prva HNL standings and secured their spot in the Europa League qualifications.

Benko started  the new 2013–14 season in strong fashion, netting 11 goals in first 11 appearances. He scored five goals in the 2013–14 UEFA Europa League qualifying phase, including two goals against VfB Stuttgart in Europa League play-off round. His goals helped Rijeka to reach their first ever Europa League group stage where they were drawn in Group I together with Olympique Lyonnais, Real Betis and Vitória S.C.. On 28 September, he scored a spectacular volley against Rijeka's greatest rivals Hajduk Split in Adriatic derby. A month later, on Matchday 2 of the 2013–14 Europa League, Benko scored another volley goal against Real Betis to give his team 1–0 lead on Stadion Kantrida. The match eventually finished 1–1.

Dalian Aerbin
On 24 February 2014, Benko reportedly signed for Chinese Super League team Dalian Aerbin for an undisclosed fee.

On 28 April 2015, Benko filed a lawsuit at the Hong Kong High Court against the holding company of Dalian Aerbin for unpaid wages and image rights. Benko claimed that his contract with Dalian was worth 1.02 million euros. However, four months into his contract, he was paid only 36,000 euros. He has terminated his contract with Dalian since then.

Sarajevo
On 12 September 2014, Benko reportedly signed for Bosnian Premier League club FK Sarajevo as a free agent.

During the first half of the 2014–15 Premier League, he scored 9 goals in 14 appearances. In the next season, Sarajevo was ranked third in the league and Benko was the league top goalscorer with 17 goals. At the beginning of the 2016–17 season Benko got suspended for drinking alcohol before a match against rival club Zrinjski.

Olimpija Ljubljana
After falling out with Sarajevo over his suspension, Benko signed a two-year contract with Slovenian PrvaLiga club Olimpija Ljubljana on a free transfer on 30 August 2016.

During the mid-season, on 15 December 2016, the club announced that Benko would be departing from the club due to poor performances. In the end, Benko stayed at the club, scoring 14 goals in 34 appearances for the club in all competitions. He also appeared in the final of the 2017 Slovenian Football Cup, where Olimpija lost 1–0 to Domžale.

Varaždin
On 20 August 2018, Benko signed for the Croatian second tier club Varaždin. On 18 May 2019, he scored two goals in Varaždin's 3–1 home win against Šibenik, which secured his team a promotion to the Prva HNL.

International career
Benko has been capped for the Croatian national under-21 team and he subsequently went on to make his debut for the country's A-team by appearing in both of their two matches at the 2006 Carlsberg Cup in Hong Kong.

Benko was once again included in the roster for the friendly match against South Korea on 10 September 2013. He provided a crucial assist for Domagoj Vida who scored the first goal in 65th minute of the match. Croatia went on to win the match, being their second match and second win against South Korea side in the year of 2013 alone. His prolific goalscoring form in his club earned him another call-up, this time for the Croatia crucial 2014 World Cup play-off matches against Iceland on 15 November 2013.

Career statistics

Club

International

Honours
Nürnberg
DFB-Pokal: 2006–07

Standard Liège
Belgian Pro League: 2008–09

Sarajevo 
Bosnian Premier League: 2014–15

Olimpija Ljubljana
Slovenian PrvaLiga: 2017–18
Slovenian Cup: 2017–18

Varaždin
2. HNL: 2018–19

Individual
Awards 
Croatian Football Hope of the Year: 2005
SN Yellow Shirt Award: 2013
Football Oscar Team of the Year: 2013
HNL's Football Player of the Year: 2013

Performance
Croatian Cup Top Goalscorer: 2005–06 (9 goals)
1. HNL Top Goalscorer: 2012–13 (18 goals)
Bosnian Premier League Top Goalscorer: 2015–16 (17 goals)
Slovenian Cup Top Goalscorer: 2016–17 (4 goals), 2017–18 (5 goals)
2. HNL Top Goalscorer: 2018–19 (21 goals)

References

External links

1983 births
Living people
Sportspeople from Varaždin
Association football forwards
Croatian footballers
Croatia youth international footballers
Croatia under-21 international footballers
Croatia international footballers
NK Varaždin players
1. FC Nürnberg players
Standard Liège players
K.V. Kortrijk players
NK Slaven Belupo players
Al-Faisaly FC players
HNK Rijeka players
Dalian Professional F.C. players
FK Sarajevo players
NK Olimpija Ljubljana (2005) players
Croatian Football League players
Bundesliga players
Belgian Pro League players
Saudi Professional League players
Chinese Super League players
Premier League of Bosnia and Herzegovina players
Slovenian PrvaLiga players
First Football League (Croatia) players
Second Football League (Croatia) players
Croatian expatriate footballers
Croatian expatriate sportspeople in Germany
Croatian expatriate sportspeople in Belgium
Croatian expatriate sportspeople in Saudi Arabia
Croatian expatriate sportspeople in China
Croatian expatriate sportspeople in Bosnia and Herzegovina
Croatian expatriate sportspeople in Slovenia
Expatriate footballers in Germany
Expatriate footballers in Belgium
Expatriate footballers in Saudi Arabia
Expatriate footballers in China
Expatriate footballers in Bosnia and Herzegovina
Expatriate footballers in Slovenia